Kings of Uí Díarmata from c.971 onwards. There are large temporal gaps where no kings or lords are attested.

Tadhg of Uí Díarmata, died 971
Gillacommain mac Niall, died 991
Muirgheas mac Aedh, died 999
Mac Cú Ceanain, died 1021.
Muirgeas ua Cú Ceanainn, died 1037
Aedh Ua Con Ceanainn, died 1067
Muirgheas Ua Cú Ceannainn, died 1105
Aedh Ua Con Ceannainn, died 1119
Donnchadh Ua Con Ceanainn, died 1143
Teige Ua Con Ceannainn, fl. c. 1152; foster-father of Cathal Crobhdearg Ua Conchobair
Uada Ua Con Ceanainn, died a cleric, 1167
Cú Ceanain Ó Con Ceanainn, died 1224
Donnell Ó Con Ceanainn, died 1316 at the Battle of Athenry
Aodh Ó Con Ceanainn, fl. 1319
Cathal mac Davok Ó Con Ceanainn, died 1370
O Conceanainn, died 1382.
Ó Conceanainn, died 1389
Tomas Ó Con Ceanainn, died 1478
William Ó Con Ceanainn, fl. 1478
Davok Ó Con Ceanainn, fl. 1478, to Connemara
Ó Con Ceanainn of Cooloo, fl. 1574
Melaghlin and Teige Ó Con Ceanainn, joint rulers, fl. 1574

References

 http://bill.celt.dias.ie/vol4/displayObject.php?TreeID=8536
The Story of the Concannons, Maureen Concannon O'Brien, Clan Publications, Dublin, c.1995.
The Tribes and Customs of Hy-Many, John O'Donovan, 1843
The Parish of Ballinasloe, Fr. Jerome A. Fahey.
https://www.webcitation.org/query?url=http://www.geocities.com/Athens/Aegean/2444/irish/LD.htm&date=2009-10-25+05:47:51
Vol. 2 (AD 903–1171): edition and translation
Annals of Ulster at CELT: Corpus of Electronic Texts at University College Cork
Annals of Tigernach at CELT: Corpus of Electronic Texts at University College Cork
Revised edition of McCarthy's synchronisms at Trinity College Dublin.

Ui Diarmata